Melanosternarchus is a genus of ghost knifefish found in the Amazon basin of tropical South America. The single species in this genus, Melanosternarchus amaru is primarily found in the deep channels of large blackwater rivers.
This species can be recognized by its large mouth, slender body and an absence of scales on its nape and dorsum. Its maximum recorded size is 272 mm (10.7 inches).

References

Fish of South America

Apteronotidae
Monotypic freshwater fish genera